Miss Nord-Pas-de-Calais is a French beauty pageant which selects a representative for the Miss France national competition from the region of Nord-Pas-de-Calais. Women representing the region under various different titles have competed at Miss France since 1920, although the Miss Nord-Pas-de-Calais title was not used regularly until 2010.

The current Miss Nord-Pas-de-Calais is Agathe Cauet, who was crowned Miss Nord-Pas-de-Calais 2022 on 15 October 2022. Three women from Nord-Pas-de-Calais have been crowned Miss France:
Camille Cerf, who was crowned Miss France 2015
Iris Mittenaere, who was crowned Miss France 2016
Maëva Coucke, who was crowned Miss France 2018

Results summary
Miss France: Camille Cerf (2014); Iris Mittenaere (2015); Maëva Coucke (2017)
1st Runner-Up: Catherine Pouchele (1976; Miss Flanders); Catherine Clarysse (1990; Miss Littoral-Nord); Hélène Lantoine (1994; Miss Flanders); Caroline Cléry (1995; Miss Flanders); Agathe Cauet (2022)
2nd Runner-Up: Dany Coutelier (1972; Miss Flanders); Sylvie Wadoux (1981; Miss Côte d'Opale); Nancy Delettrez (1995; Miss Côte d'Opale); Vanessa Agez (1998; Miss Flanders); Aurélie Tuil (2003; Miss Flanders); Sophie Garénaux (2012)
3rd Runner-Up: Nadia Kouhen (1973; Miss Flanders); Emmanuelle Jagodsinski (2001; Miss Artois-Hainaut)
4th Runner-Up: Marie-Caroline Delcroix (1975; Miss Côte d'Opale); Caroline Charles (1985; Miss Côte d'Opale); Caroline Charles (1986; Miss Lille-Métropole); Anne Houzé (1997; Miss Hainaut); Élise Duboquet (2000; Miss Flanders); Lætitia Marciniak (2003; Miss Artois-Hainaut)
5th Runner-Up: Brigitte Maréchal (1978; Miss Côte d'Opale)
6th Runner-Up: Patricia Hérin (1978; Miss Flanders); Catherine Dupuy (1979; Miss Côte d'Opale); France Willemyns (2004; Miss Flanders)
Top 12/Top 15: Nathalie Pallardy (1986; Miss Flanders); Nathalie Thibaud (1988; Miss Flanders); Valérie Masquelier (1989; Miss Littoral-Nord); Marjorie Eloy (1991; Miss Littoral-Nord); Charlotte Verpraet (1995; Miss Hainaut); Caroline Lubrez (1996; Miss Hainaut); Jessica Dherbometz (2002; Miss Flanders); Lydie Tison (2002; Miss Artois-Hainaut); Juliette Andry (2005; Miss Flanders); Annabelle Varane (2018); Donatella Meden (2021)

Titleholders

Miss Artois
In 1979 and from 1991 to 1994, the department of Pas-de-Calais competed separately under the title Miss Artois.

Miss Artois-Côte d'Opale
In 1996 and 1997, the department of Pas-de-Calais competed separately under the title Miss Artois-Côte d'Opale.

Miss Artois-Hainaut
From 1999 to 2009, the region crowned a representative under the title Miss Artois-Hainaut.

Miss Côte d'Opale
From 1973 to 1995, the region crowned a representative under the title Miss Côte d'Opale.

Miss Flanders
From the 1970s to 2000s, the department of Nord competed separately under the title Miss Flanders.

Miss Hainaut
From the 1995 to 1998, the department of Nord competed separately under the title Miss Hainaut.

Miss Lille
In 1961, 1978, and 1979, the department of Nord competed separately under the title Miss Lille. In 1976, 1977, 1985, and 1986, the department competed as Miss Lille-Métropole.

Miss Littoral-Nord
From the 1970s to 1990s, the department of Nord competed separately under the title Miss Littoral-Nord.

Miss Maubeuge
In 1976, the department of Nord competed separately under the title Miss Maubeuge.

Miss Métropole-Nord
In 1978, the department of Nord competed separately under the title Miss Métropole-Nord.

Notes

References

External links

Miss France regional pageants
Beauty pageants in France
Women in France